Loci Communes is a compilation of sententiae or moral sentences written by Greek monk Antonius Melissa (c. 11th century). It is similar to another Loci communes, attributed to Maximus Confessor, but which is in reality by an anonymous author. Both works contain extracts from the early Christian fathers, and also contain quotations from earlier Jewish and pagan authors. The two works have often been printed together, and have often been printed at the end of the editions of Stobaeus.

Nothing is known about the author. The surname traditionally applied to Antonius, Melissa ("the Bee"), seems to have been, in fact, the original title of his compilation.

References

Byzantine literature